Diego Casamán (born March 10, 1990 in Montevideo) is a Uruguayan footballer who last played for C.A. Rentistas of the Uruguayan Primera División.

Teams
  Peñarol 2006–07
  Villa Española 2007
  Provincial Osorno 2008
  Villa Española 2008
  Newell's Old Boys 2009–10
  Rocha 2010–11
  Rentistas 2011

References
 

1990 births
Living people
Uruguayan footballers
Uruguayan expatriate footballers
Peñarol players
Newell's Old Boys footballers
Provincial Osorno footballers
Villa Española players
Rocha F.C. players
C.A. Rentistas players
Expatriate footballers in Chile
Expatriate footballers in Argentina
Association football midfielders